Bartłomiej is a Polish masculine given name, a cognate of Bartholomew. Diminutive forms of Bartłomiej include Bartek and Bartosz. Notable people with the name Bartłomiej include:

B
 Bartłomiej Babiarz (born 1989), Polish footballer
 Bartłomiej Bartnicki (born 1981), Polish Freestyle wrestler
 Bartłomiej Bartosiak (born 1991), Polish footballer
 Bartłomiej Bołądź (born 1994), Polish volleyball player
 Bartłomiej Bonk (born 1984), Polish weightlifter

C
 Bartłomiej Ciepiela (born 2001), Polish footballer
 Bartłomiej Chwalibogowski (born 1982), Polish footballer

D
 Bartłomiej Dąbrowski (born 1972), Polish tennis player
 Bartłomiej Drągowski (born 1997), Polish footballer
 Bartłomiej Dudzic (born 1988), Polish footballer

G
 Bartłomiej Groicki (c. 1534–1605), Polish jurist
 Bartłomiej Grzechnik (born 1993), Polish volleyball player
 Bartłomiej Grzelak (born 1981), Polish footballer

H
 Bartłomiej Heberla (born 1985), Polish chess Grandmaster

J
 Bartłomiej Jaszka (born 1983), Polish handball player

K
 Bartłomiej Kalinkowski (born 1994), Polish footballer
 Bartłomiej Kasprzak (born 1993), Polish footballer
 Bartłomiej Kasprzykowski (born 1977), Polish actor
 Bartłomiej Konieczny (born 1981), Polish footballer
 Bartłomiej Kruczek (born 19??), Polish slalom canoeist

L
 Bartłomiej Lemański (born 1996), Polish volleyball player

M
 Bartłomiej Macieja (born 1977), Polish chess Grandmaster
 Bartłomiej Matysiak (born 1984), Polish racing cyclist

N
 Bartłomiej Niedziela (born 1985), Polish footballer

O
 Bartłomiej Olszewski (born 1996), Polish footballer

P
 Bartłomiej Pawełczak (born 1982), Polish rower
 Bartłomiej Pawłowski (born 1992), Polish footballer
 Bartłomiej Pękiel (fl. from 1633–d. ca. 1670), Polish classical music composer

S
 Bartłomiej Sielewski (born 1984), Polish footballer
 Bartłomiej Sienkiewicz (born 1961), Polish politician
 Bartłomiej Smuczyński (born 1995), Polish footballer
 Bartłomiej Socha (born 1981), Polish footballer
 Bartłomiej Szrajber (born 1954), Polish politician

T
 Bartłomiej Tomczak (born 1985), Polish handball player
 Bartłomiej Topa (born 1967), Polish actor

Z
 Bartłomiej Żynel (born 1998), Polish football player

See also

References 

Polish masculine given names